The 1945 All-SEC football team consists of American football players selected to the All-Southeastern Conference (SEC) chosen by various selectors for the 1945 college football season. Alabama won the conference title.

All-SEC selections

Ends
Bill Hildebrand, Miss. St. (AP, UP-1)
Rebel Steiner, Alabama (AP, UP-2)
Reid Moseley, Georgia (UP-1)
Clyde Lindsey, LSU (UP-2)

Tackles
Bob Davis, Georgia Tech (AP, UP-1)
Tom Whitley, Alabama (AP, UP-2)
Mike Castronis, Georgia (UP-1)
Jack White, Florida (UP-2)

Guards
Bob Dobelstein, Tennessee  (AP, UP-1)
Felix Trapani, LSU (AP, UP-1)
Gaston Bourgeois, Tulane (UP-2)
Herbert St. John, Georgia (UP-2)

Centers
Vaughn Mancha, Alabama (College Football Hall of Fame)  (AP, UP-1)
Paul Duke, Georgia Tech (UP-2)

Quarterbacks
Harry Gilmer, Alabama (College Football Hall of Fame)  (AP, UP-1)

Halfbacks
Charley Trippi, Georgia (College Football Hall of Fame)  (AP, UP-1)
Harper Davis, Miss. St. (AP, UP-1)
Buster Stephens, Tennessee (UP-2)
Bill Fuqua, Vanderbilt (UP-2)
Curtis Kuykendall, Auburn (UP-2)

Fullbacks
Gene Knight, LSU (AP, UP-1)
George Mathews, Georgia Tech (UP-2)

Key

AP = Associated Press

UP = United Press.

Bold = Consensus first-team selection by both AP and UP

See also
1945 College Football All-America Team

References

All-SEC
All-SEC football teams